The Magnificent Ambersons is a 1918 novel written by Booth Tarkington.

The Magnificent Ambersons may also refer to:
 The Magnificent Ambersons (film), a 1942 American period drama directed by Orson Welles
 The Magnificent Ambersons (2002 film), a poorly received 2002 television film, directed by Alfonso Arau